Secundus is the Latin word for "second."  However, it also had the meaning of "favorable" or "lucky."  It functions both as a proper name and a numeral title. It can refer to:

People

Ancient Romans
Pliny the Elder or Gaius Plinius Secundus (23-79)
Pliny the Younger or Gaius Plinius Caecilius Secundus (61-c. 112)
Lucius Pedanius Secundus (died 61), consul and praefectus urbi
Pomponius Secundus, first century general and poet
Quintus Petilius Secundus (c. 40-c. 65), legionary
Quintus Pomponius Secundus, aristocrat and brother of Pomponius Secundus
Titus Petronius Secundus (40-97), a prefect of the Praetorian Guard

Ancient Greeks
Secundus the Silent, second century philosopher who took a vow of silence

Early Christians
Secundus of Abula, first century missionary and martyr
Secundus of Asti (died 119), saint
Secundus (died c. 295), martyr (see Carpophorus, Exanthus, Cassius, Severinus, Secundus, and Licinius)
Secundus of Ptolemais, fourth century bishop
Secundus of Non or Secundus of Trent (died c. 612), adviser to Lombard King Agilulf
Secundus of Tigisis

Other
Johannes Secundus (1511–1536), Dutch neo-Latin poet
Petrus Lotichius Secundus (1528-1560), scholar and neo-Latin poet born Peter Lotz 
Alexander Monro (secundus) (1733–1817), Scottish physician

Science fiction
Secundus, a fictional planet in the Robert A. Heinlein novel Time Enough for Love and subsequent books featuring Lazarus Long
Salusa Secundus, a formerly prison planet in Frank Herbert's Dune series. It was devastated by atomic weapons before the events of Dune: House Atreides in Brian Herbert's Legends of Dune 
Secundus Ando, a planet in the Star Wars The Clone Wars TV series. Also home of the Harch, a sentient arachnid species
 Imperium Secundus, known also as the Unremembered Empire in the Warhammer 40000 franchise, is the second stellar empire of Humanity created by the Ultramarines Primarch Roboute Guilliman during the Horus Heresy following the Battle of Calth and the Drop Site Massacre of Istvaan V.

See also
Primus (disambiguation)
Tertius (disambiguation)